The Midland Railway Class 2 4-4-0 was a series of 12 classes of 4-4-0 steam locomotives built by and for the Midland Railway between 1876 and 1901 while Samuel W. Johnson held the post of locomotive superintendent. They were designed for use on express passenger trains but later on were downgraded to secondary work when more powerful types were introduced.

During their history they were repeatably rebuilt, sometimes leaving virtually none of their original parts.

As built
275 were built in all:

The "B", "D" and "E" boilers all had the same 4 ft 1 in diameter barrel, but had progressively longer fireboxes, "D" 7 inches longer than "B" and "E" 6 inches longer than "D", giving a larger grate area.

Starting with the "1738" class boilers were made of steel rather than wrought iron, which accounts for the higher permitted pressures.

Later history

"1312" and "1327" classes
The two earliest classes never received larger boilers, though between 1884 and 1891 the "1312"s received enlarged cylinders of 18 in × 22 in.

Withdrawals began in 1904 with two of the "1327" class. 16 out of 30 survived to the grouping but not long after, the last withdrawal being in 1934.

"1667" class
These were built with Joy valve gear. This proved not altogether satisfactory and the 10 engines were withdrawn early (between 1896 & 1901) and replaced by new engines of the "150" class with the same numbers.

Remainder
From 1904 to 1907 all 195 were re-equipped with larger "H" boilers, the same length as the "E", but with a larger diameter (4 ft 8 in rather than 4 ft 1 in).

However, only a few years later, from 1909–1911, many of these were replaces again with "G7" Belpaire boilers. This affected 44 engines, mostly of the earlier classes ("1562", "1738" and "1808").

But starting in 1912 a decision was made to instead rebuild the class with superheated "G7S" boilers. The results were essentially completely new engines (designated "483" class), but carrying the numbers of old ones. A possible reason for this was that royalties paid to the Schmidt superheater company were less for a "rebuild" than for a new engine.  "H" boilers so released were passed onto 0-6-0 goods engines.

This started with the "156", "2421" and "60" classes and continued until the end of 1923, when 157 had been "renewed".

This "483" class formed the basis for the LMS Class 2P 4-4-0 of which 138 were built.

Details of "483" class:

Withdrawal
Those 37 still with "H" boilers were all withdrawn 1925–1928.

Those with "G7" boilers mostly went in the late 1920s and 30s, but the last one survived until 1952.

The "483" conversions all survived to be nationalized, the last withdrawal was in 1963. None have been preserved.

References

Further reading 
 Bob Essery and David Jenkinson An Illustrated Review of Midland Locomotives from 1883 (Didcot, Oxon: Wild Swan Publications)
Vol. 2 – Passenger tender classes (1988) 
 Stephen Summerson Midland Railway Locomotives – Irwell Press
Vol. 3 – Johnson classes part 1 : the slim boiler passenger tender engines, passenger and goods tank engines. 

Midland Railway locomotives
4-4-0 locomotives
Kitson locomotives
Dübs locomotives
Sharp Stewart locomotives
Beyer, Peacock locomotives
Neilson locomotives
Scrapped locomotives
Standard gauge steam locomotives of Great Britain
2′B n2 locomotives